The Eratosthenian period in the lunar geologic timescale runs from 3,200 million years ago to 1,100 million years ago. It is named after the crater Eratosthenes, which displays characteristics typical of craters of this age, including a surface that is not significantly eroded by subsequent impacts, but which also does not possess a ray system.  The massive basaltic volcanism of the Imbrian period tapered off and ceased during this long span of lunar time. The youngest lunar lava flows identified from orbital images are tentatively placed near the end of this period.

Its Earth equivalent consists of most of the Mesoarchean and Neoarchean eras (Archean eon), Paleoproterozoic and Mesoproterozoic eras (Proterozoic eon).

Examples
Other than Eratosthenes itself, examples of large Eratosthenian craters on the near side of the moon include Langrenus, Macrobius, Aristoteles, Hausen, Moretus, Pythagoras, Scoresby, Bullialdus, Plutarch, and Cavalerius.  On the far side, examples include Olcott, Hamilton, Birkeland, Finsen, Kirkwood, and Ricco.

References